Foundation is the fourth album by hip hop group Brand Nubian. It was released on September 29, 1998, via Arista. The album marked the reunion of the four original members, Grand Puba, Sadat X, Lord Jamar and DJ Alamo, who hadn't released an album together since their 1990 debut One for All.

Foundation saw the group regain their past success, critically and commercially. The single "Don't Let It Go to Your Head" became their biggest Billboard Hot 100 hit, in 1998, and was remixed by The Neptunes as the 12" single "Take It To Your Head" in the same year.

Unlike previous releases, Foundation mostly features outside production, resulting in an updated sound. DJ Premier, O.Gee, C.L. Liggio and the D.I.T.C. members Lord Finesse, Diamond D and Buckwild all supplied beats for the album. The album is now out of print.

Track listing

Credits adapted from Discogs.

All tracks are performed by Grand Puba, Sadat X and Lord Jamar expect where noted.

Notes
 signifies a co-producer.
"Maybe One Day" features backing vocals from Keon Bryce
"Let's Dance" features backing vocals from Adeka and Rebbie Jackson
"Sincerely" features backing vocals from Brooklyn Starr
"Too Late" features backing vocals from Shelene
"U For Me" features backing vocals from Petawane

Charts

Singles

References

1998 albums
Brand Nubian albums
Albums produced by DJ Premier
Albums produced by Buckwild
Albums produced by Lord Finesse
Arista Records albums